Sadhna News is a Hindi-language 24/7 News television channel, owned by Asia Limited.

References

Hindi-language television channels in India
Television channels and stations established in 2005
Hindi-language television stations
Television channels based in Lucknow